Duloe ( (Eng. 'Two Rivers')) is a village and civil parish in Cornwall, England, United Kingdom. The village of Herodsfoot and the hamlets of Churchbridge, Highercliff, Milcombe, Tredinnick, Trefanny Hill, Tregarlandbridge and Tregarrick Mill are also in the parish. The manors of Brodbane, Trenant, Lanwarnick, Killigorick and Tremadart are mentioned in the Domesday Book (1086).

Parish church
The parish church of Duloe is dedicated to St Cuby and St Leonard and was built in early medieval times. Its plan is unusual since the tower is at the end of the south transept. The tower is 13th century and an upper stage was added in the Perpendicular style. However this stage was removed in 1861. (There is now no access to the tower from the transept as the archway between was blocked up at an early date.)

There is a north aisle which continues eastwards to form a chancel aisle which is grander in style (though the arches are lower) and was the family chapel of the Colshull family. There is a fine monument here of Sir John Colshull (d. 1483). The effigy of Sir John in full armour lies on a slab of elvan stone on top of a tomb chest ornamented with shields and at the west end a crucifixion. The parclose screen bears coats of arms connected with the Colshulls and may be made up of parts of a rood screen. Both inside and outside the family chapel is more highly ornamented than the rest of the church. Other monuments commemorate Ann Coffyn (d. 1592), John Killiow (d. 1601) and his wife (a tomb chest), Mary Arundell (d. 1629) with a curious epitaph comparing man to the laurel tree, and Henry Bewes (d. 1793). The Coffyn memorial shows her in Elizabethan dress and is of slate; another slate memorial is to two unknown wives and their children, also shown in Elizabethan dress. The Bewes memorial is by William Adron and shows a woman in relief.
Church website www.stcubyduloe.org.uk

Landmarks

The village has a primary school, Duloe C of E VA School. This is a Church of England Voluntary aided school in the Diocese of Truro. It is also the location of Duloe stone circle in a field behind a nearby farm. The holy well is half a mile away from the church towards Looe: it is covered by a modern well house.

Treworgey
Treworgey is a plain Georgian house of seven bays and two storeys which has been much restored after a fire. In the garden are large yews and a clock tower. The clock tower and attached steps at Treworgey are Grade II* listed. The video of Hawkwind's Treworgey Tree Fayre was recorded here on 29 July 1989.

There are also Treworgey in Liskeard and Treworgie in Manaccan. All three have the same derivation: "Wurci's farm".

References

External links

Villages in Cornwall
Civil parishes in Cornwall